Jim Reeves on Stage is a live album by Jim Reeves, released posthumously in 1968 on RCA Victor. It was produced by Chet Atkins.

Track listing 
Side 1
 Medley:"Mexican Joe" (Torok)"Yonder Comes a Sucker" (Reeves)
 Medley:Dialogue"Four Walls" (Moore, Campbell)"I Missed Me" (Anderson)"Tennessee Waltz" (King, Stewart)"I Really Don't Want to Know" (Robertson, Barnes)"He'll Have to Go" (Allison, Allison)
 Medley:Dialogue"Walking the Floor over You" (Tubb)Dialogue"There Stands the Glass" (Shurtz, Hull, Greisham)Dialogue"One by One" (Wright, Anglin, Anglin)Dialogue"Guess Things Happen That Way" (Clement)Dialogue"I Want to Be with You Always" (Frizzell, Beck)
 Dialogue"Wildwood Flower" (Carter)

Side 2
 Dialogue"The Blizzard" (Howard)
 Dialogue"Your Old Love Letters" (Bond)
 Dialogue"Am I Losing You" (Reeves)
 Dialogue"Bimbo" (Rod Morris)
 Dialogue"Stand at Your Window" (Carroll)
 Dialogue"Danny Boy (Trad. Weatherly)Dialogue

Charts

References 

1968 live albums
Jim Reeves albums
RCA Victor live albums
Albums produced by Chet Atkins